The title of Earl of Eltham has been created twice as a subsidiary title.  The first creation was in the Peerage of Great Britain in 1726 as a subsidiary title for the Duke of Edinburgh, eldest son of the Prince of Wales.  This merged in the crown in 1760.

The second creation was in 1917 in the Peerage of the United Kingdom for the Duke of Teck, brother of Queen Mary, who gave up his German titles for the British title of Marquess of Cambridge.

Earls of Eltham, first creation (1726)
Frederick, Prince of Wales (1707-1751)
George, Prince of Wales (1738-1820), merged in crown 1760.

Earls of Eltham, second creation (1917)
see Marquess of Cambridge

Noble titles created in 1726
Extinct earldoms in the Peerage of Great Britain
Noble titles created in 1917
Extinct earldoms in the Peerage of the United Kingdom
British and Irish peerages which merged in the Crown